George Augustus Robinson (22 March 1791 – 18 October 1866) was a British-born colonial official and self-trained preacher in colonial Australia. In 1824, Robinson travelled to Hobart, Van Diemen’s Land, where he attempted to negotiate a peace between European settlers and Aboriginal Tasmanians prior to the outbreak of the Black War. He was appointed Chief Protector of Aborigines by the Aboriginal Protection Board in Port Phillip District, New South Wales in 1839, a position he held until 1849.

Early life 
Robinson was born on 22 March 1791, probably in London, England, to William Robinson, a construction worker, and Susannah Robinson (née Perry). He followed his father into the building trade, married Maria Amelia Evans on 28 February 1814, and had five children over the next ten years. He was connected with the engineering department at the Chatham Dockyard and had some involvement with the construction of martello towers along England's coast, possibly as a superintendent.

Van Diemen's Land 

Robinson arrived in Hobart in January 1824, having apparently nearly been a victim of Gregor MacGregor's fraudulent Poyais scheme. He established himself as a builder and was soon employing several men. He was secretary of the Bethel Union and was a committee member of the Auxiliary Bible Society, also helping to found the Van Diemen's Land Mechanics' Institution. He was joined by his wife and children in April 1826.

Aboriginal Tasmanians
Conflicts between settlers and Aboriginal Tasmanians had vastly increased during the 1820s, which became known as the Black War. In 1830 Robinson investigated the Cape Grim massacre that had occurred in 1828 and reported that 30 Aborigines had been massacred. Robinson was to be brought in as a "conciliator" between settlers and Aboriginal people. His mission was to round up the Aboriginal people to resettle them at the camp of Wybalenna on Flinders Island.

Robinson befriended Truganini, to whom he promised food, housing and security on Flinders Island until the situation on the mainland had calmed down. With Truganini, Robinson succeeded in forging an agreement with the Big River and Oyster Bay peoples, and by the end of 1835, nearly all the Aboriginal people had been relocated to the new settlement.

Robinson's involvement with the Aboriginal Tasmanians ended soon after this, though, and the Wybalenna settlement became more akin to a prison as the camp conditions deteriorated and many of the residents died of ill health and homesickness. Because of this, Robinson's place in history is generally viewed as negative, especially within the current Aboriginal community. Some historians agree that his initial intentions were genuine, but his abandonment of the community is viewed as a turning point for the worse for the Tasmanian Aboriginals. Moreover, his promises of providing a place where Aboriginal people could practise their cultural traditions and ceremonies never came to fruition.

Chief Protector of Aborigines in Port Phillip District 

Robinson became Chief Protector of Aborigines in March 1839, managing the Protectorate of Port Phillip with the help of four Assistant Protectors, William Thomas, James Dredge, Edward Stone Parker and Charles Sievwright. Maria, Robinson's wife died in 1848.

During his decade of service as Chief Protector he made more than 20 expeditions into the four districts of the Aboriginal Protectorate.

Robinson was paid a total of £8000 in his role as protector of Aborigines. He built a small community that included a church and coined the area 'Point Civilisation'. Many of the Aborigines who lived at the port had been removed under false pretenses from their true home in Tasmania.

In 1841 and 1842, Robinson traveled to western Victoria with Tunnerminnerwait where he investigated and reported on the Convincing Ground massacre that had occurred in 1833 or 1834. In 1841 he investigated a gunshot incident, and whilst travelling came across the aboriginal aquaculture site of Lake Condah, recording its dimensions.

His journals are regarded as amongst the most important documents on the early years of European settlement in Victoria. They offer significant observations on Koorie culture, early Melbourne personalities, the landscape and settler society.

Later life 
The Port Phillip Protectorate was abolished on 31 December 1849, with Robinson receiving a pension. He returned to England in 1852 and the following year married Rose Pyne, with whom he had another five children. The couple spent five years living in Europe, mostly in Paris and Rome. In 1859 they settled in Bath, England, where Robinson died on 18 October 1866 at the age of 75.

Robinson in contemporary culture

Semi-fictional accounts of Robinson's travels are included in Matthew Kneale's book English Passengers and in T. C. Boyle's short story "The Extinction Tales", and Robinson is a major character in Richard Flanagan's 2008 novel Wanting.
There is a reference to Robinson in the book The Lost Diamonds of Killiecrankie by Gary Crew and Peter Gouldthorpe, and in Following the Equator, by Mark Twain. Robert Drewes' 'Savage Crows' also incorporates the work of Robinson into the plot. See also Mudrooroo's critical portrayal of Robinson in Doctor Wooreddy's Prescription for Enduring the Ending of the World, Master of the Ghost Dreaming and his Vampire Trilogy: The Undying, Underground and The Promised Land. Additionally, Cassandra Pybus' 2020 biography of Truganini, entitled Truganini: Journey Through the Apocalypse provides a detailed account of Robinson's personal relationship with Truganini and the traumatic psychological and cultural shifts experienced by Aboriginal Tasmanians.

Tasmanian artist Julie Gough referenced Robinson and his work in her recent exhibition Tense Past at Tasmania Museum & Art Gallery.

Robinson and museum collections
During Robinson's time in Tasmania and Victoria, he collected a large number of objects and artworks from the Aboriginal communities there. After his death, his widow Rose sold the items to many museums. The British Museum has 138 items relating to Robinson's time in Australia, including Aboriginal artefacts, prints and drawings. Joseph Barnard Davis acquired many from Robinson's widow in the 1860s, and it may be through his activities that objects subsequently found their way into other collections, for example at the British Museum. Leeds Discovery Centre has two spears he collected. The Pitt Rivers Museum in Oxford holds nineteen objects relating to Robinson's time abroad. The collection at Pitt Rivers includes several paintings and prints describing individual people from Aboriginal communities, including: Truggernana, Jenny, and Fanny, amongst others.

Notes

References

 Vivienne Rae-Ellis, Black Robinson Protector of Aborigines, Melbourne University Press, 1988 
 Lyndall Ryan, Tasmanian Aborigines: a history since 1803, Allen & Unwin, 2012  (esp. pp. 151–239)

External links
 George Augustus Robinson - State Library of NSW
 George Augustus Robinson - State Records of NSW
 the journals and papers of George Augustus Robinson (1791-1866) - NSW State Library Protector of Aborigines Heritage Collection
 Black Robinson: Protector of Aborigines. A controversial study of by Vivienne Rae-Ellis Melbourne University Press
 Calder, James E.(1875). Some Account of the Wars, Extirpation, Habits, &c., of the Native Tribes of Tasmania esp. p. 20

1791 births
1866 deaths
Australian builders
Australian Christian religious leaders
English emigrants to colonial Australia
Settlers of Tasmania
Settlers of Melbourne
Indigenous Australians in Tasmania
19th-century Australian public servants
Australian diarists
19th-century diarists